Tarwa N-Tiniri are a six-piece band from Ouarzazate in Morocco. Formed in 2012, they have released one album Azizdeg in 2019 and toured Norway and France.

References

Moroccan musical groups